Jared McGriff-Culver (born November 30, 1989) is an American football fullback who is currently a free agent. He played college football at Missouri where he was a running back. He was signed as an undrafted free agent by the Oakland Raiders in 2013.

Professional career

Oakland Raiders
After going undrafted during the 2013 NFL Draft, McGriff-Culver was signed by the Oakland Raiders. mini-Camp or Practice Squad ONLY

Chicago Blitz
After failing to catch on elsewhere in the NFL, McGriff-Culver signed with the Chicago Blitz of the Continental Indoor Football League (CIFL), where he played as a defensive end. After a single game with the Blitz, he left the team to pursue a different opportunity.

Jacksonville Sharks
On February 18, 2014, McGriff-Culver was assigned to the Jacksonville Sharks of the Arena Football League (AFL). The move to the AFL also gave McGriff-Culver the chance to be a running back again. He was placed on reassignment by the Sharks on March 17, 2015.

References

External links
 Arena Football League Bio

1989 births
Living people
American football fullbacks
American football defensive ends
Missouri Tigers football players
Chicago Blitz (indoor football) players
Jacksonville Sharks players
Players of American football from Illinois